The 2015 World Wheelchair Curling Championship was held from February 6 to 13 at the Kisakallio Sports Institute in Lohja, Finland.

Qualification
 (host country)
Top seven teams from the 2013 World Wheelchair Curling Championship:

Two teams from the 2015 WWhCC Qualification Event

Qualification event

Two teams will qualify for the World Championship from the qualifying event held in November 2014 in Lillehammer, Norway.

Teams

Round robin standings
Final Round Robin Standings

Round robin results
All draw times are listed in Eastern European Time (UTC+02).

Draw 1
Saturday, February 7, 17:00

Draw 2
Sunday, February 8, 9:30

Draw 3
Sunday, February 8, 15:30

Draw 4
Monday, February 9, 9:30

Draw 5
Monday, February 9, 15:30

Draw 6
Tuesday, February 10, 9:30

Draw 7
Tuesday, February 10, 15:30

Draw 8
Wednesday, February 11, 9:30

Draw 9
Wednesday, February 11, 15:30

Relegation Game
Thursday, February 12, 15:30

 relegated to 2016 World Wheelchair Curling Championship – Qualification Event.

Playoffs

1 vs. 2
Thursday, February 12, 15:30

3 vs. 4
Thursday, February 12, 15:30

Semifinal
Friday, February 13, 9:00

Bronze medal game
Friday, February 13, 14:00

Gold medal game
Friday, February 13, 14:00

References

External links

World Wheelchair Curling Championship
2015 in curling
2015 in Finnish sport
International curling competitions hosted by Finland
Lohja